Group A of the 2021 Copa América, also referred to as the South Zone, took place from 14 to 28 June 2021 in Brazil. The group consisted of former co-hosts Argentina, Bolivia, Uruguay, Chile and Paraguay. It would also have included guests Australia before their withdrawal on 23 February 2021.

Originally, Group A was scheduled to be played from 12 to 30 June 2020. However, on 17 March 2020 the tournament was postponed to 2021 due to the COVID-19 pandemic in South America.

On 30 May 2021, Argentina was removed as co-host due to the COVID-19 pandemic.

Teams

Standings

In the quarter-finals:
The winners of Group A, Argentina, advanced to play the fourth-placed team of Group B, Ecuador.
The runners-up of Group A, Uruguay, advanced to play the third-placed team of Group B, Colombia.
The third-placed team of Group A, Paraguay, advanced to play the runners-up of Group B, Peru.
The fourth-placed team of Group A, Chile, advanced to play the winners of Group B, Brazil.

Matches
The original 2020 schedule and kick-off times were announced on 3 December 2019 and 4 March 2020 respectively. The new 2021 schedule was announced on 13 August 2020. Following the withdrawal of Australia, the shortened schedule was announced on 15 March 2021. The final match schedule with Brazil as host country was announced on 2 June 2021.

Matchday 1

Argentina vs Chile

Paraguay vs Bolivia

Matchday 2

Chile vs Bolivia

Argentina vs Uruguay

Matchday 3

Uruguay vs Chile

Argentina vs Paraguay

Matchday 4

Bolivia vs Uruguay

Chile vs Paraguay

Matchday 5

Uruguay vs Paraguay

Bolivia vs Argentina

Discipline
Fair play points were to be used as a tiebreaker if the overall and head-to-head records of teams were tied. These were calculated based on yellow and red cards received in all group matches as follows (Regulations Article 10):
first yellow card: minus 1 point;
indirect red card (second yellow card): minus 3 points;
direct red card: minus 4 points;
yellow card and direct red card: minus 5 points;

Only one of the above deductions was applied to a player in a single match.

Notes

References

External links

Copa América 2021, CONMEBOL.com

Group A
Argentina–Uruguay football rivalry